Hello Kaun is a Bhojpuri song sung by Ritesh Pandey featuring himself and Sneh Upadhyay. It is written and composed by Ashish Verma and directed by Rajeev Pandey. It is first Bhojpuri song and 29th Indian song to get more than 900 millions views on YouTube.

Background 
The song was released on 9 December 2019 on YouTube by Riddhi Music World.

Versions

Hariyanvi Version 
Hariyanvi version of this song released in January 2020 which was sung by Vijay Varma and Renuka Panwar. The lyrics were written by Vijay Varma and Andy Dahiya.

Music Charts 
This song rank first on Global YouTube Music Video Chart in 2020.

References 

Bhojpuri-language culture
2019 singles
Pop-rap songs